In the theory of Lie groups, Lie algebras and their representation theory, a Lie algebra extension  is an enlargement of a given Lie algebra  by another Lie algebra . Extensions arise in several ways. There is the trivial extension obtained by taking a direct sum of two Lie algebras. Other types are the split extension and the central extension. Extensions may arise naturally, for instance, when forming a Lie algebra from projective group representations. Such a Lie algebra will contain central charges.

Starting with a polynomial loop algebra over finite-dimensional simple Lie algebra and performing two extensions, a central extension and an extension by a derivation, one obtains a Lie algebra which is isomorphic with an untwisted affine Kac–Moody algebra. Using the centrally extended loop algebra one may construct a current algebra in two spacetime dimensions. The Virasoro algebra is the universal central extension of the Witt algebra.

Central extensions are needed in physics, because the symmetry group of a quantized system usually is a central extension of the classical symmetry group, and in the same way the corresponding symmetry Lie algebra of the quantum system is, in general, a central extension of the classical symmetry algebra. Kac–Moody algebras have been conjectured to be symmetry groups of a unified superstring theory. The centrally extended Lie algebras play a dominant role in quantum field theory, particularly in conformal field theory, string theory and in M-theory.

A large portion towards the end is devoted to background material for applications of Lie algebra extensions, both in mathematics and in physics, in areas where they are actually useful. A parenthetical link, (background material), is provided where it might be beneficial.

History
Due to the Lie correspondence, the theory, and consequently the history of Lie algebra extensions, is tightly linked to the theory and history of group extensions. A systematic study of group extensions was performed by the Austrian mathematician Otto Schreier in 1923 in his PhD thesis and later published.

Lie algebra extensions are most interesting and useful for infinite-dimensional Lie algebras. In 1967, Victor Kac and Robert Moody independently generalized the notion of classical Lie algebras, resulting in a new theory of infinite-dimensional Lie algebras, now called Kac–Moody algebras. They generalize the finite-dimensional simple Lie algebras and can often concretely be constructed as extensions.

Notation and proofs
Likewise for semidirect products and semidirect sums. Canonical injections (both for groups and Lie algebras) are used for implicit identifications. (just like for the groups!), partly to save scarce alphabetical resources but mostly to have a uniform notation.

Lie algebras that are ingredients in an extension will, without comment, be taken to be over the same field.

The summation convention applies, including sometimes when the indices involved are both upstairs or both downstairs.

Caveat: Not all proofs and proof outlines below have universal validity. The main reason is that the Lie algebras are often infinite-dimensional, and then there may or may not be a Lie group corresponding to the Lie algebra. Moreover, even if such a group exists, it may not have the "usual" properties, e.g. the exponential map might not exist, and if it does, it might not have all the "usual" properties. In such cases, it is questionable whether the group should be endowed with the "Lie" qualifier. The literature is not uniform. For the explicit examples, the relevant structures are supposedly in place.

Definition
Lie algebra extensions are formalized in terms of short exact sequences. A short exact sequence is an exact sequence of length three,

Moreover, 

This construction mirrors the analogous constructions in the closely related concept of group extensions.

Properties
The defining property may be reformulated.

is exact.

Let  denote two extensions and let the primes below have the obvious interpretation. Then, if there exists a Lie algebra isomorphism  such that

Equivalence of extensions is an equivalence relation.

Extension types

Trivial
A Lie algebra extension

Split
A Lie algebra extension

An ideal is a subalgebra, but a subalgebra is not necessarily an ideal. A trivial extension is thus a split extension.

Central
Non-trivial 2-cocycles occur in the context of projective representations (background) of Lie groups. This is alluded to further down.

A Lie algebra extension

Properties
Since the center commutes with everything,  in this case is abelian.
Use this section to define  by

The map  satisfies

A central extension

is universal if for every other central extension

there exist unique homomorphisms  and  such that the diagram

By universality, it is easy to conclude that such universal central extensions are unique up to isomorphism.

Construction

By direct sum
Let ,  be Lie algebras over the same field . Define

Scalar multiplication is defined by

With the Lie bracket:

 is a Lie algebra. Define further

It is clear that  holds as an exact sequence. It is, of course, nothing else than the Lie algebra direct sum. It is clear from  that the subalgebra  is an ideal (Lie algebra). This property of the direct sum of Lie algebras is promoted to the definition of a trivial extension.

By semidirect sum
Inspired by the construction of a semidirect product (background) of groups using a homomorphism , one can make the corresponding construct for Lie algebras.

It is clear that .

As with the trivial extension, this property generalizes to the definition of a split extension.

From it follows immediately that, in the Poincaré group, . Now define

Unwinding the definitions one finds that the multiplication is the same as the multiplication one started with and it follows that . From  follows that  and then from  it follows that .

By derivation

It is clear that . Such an extension is called extension by a derivation.

By 2-cocycle

Thus  is a Lie algebra. Put  and it follows that . It is called extension by a 2-cocycle.

Theorems
Below follows some results regarding central extensions and 2-cocycles.

Theorem
Let  and  be cohomologous 2-cocycles on a Lie algebra  and let  and  be respectively the central extensions constructed with these 2-cocycles.
Proof
By definition, . Define

It follows from the definitions that  is a Lie algebra isomorphism and  holds.

Corollary

The trivial 2-cocycle gives the trivial extension, and since a 2-coboundary is cohomologous with the trivial 2-cocycle, one has 
Corollary
A central extension defined by a coboundary is equivalent with a trivial central extension.

Theorem
A finite-dimensional simple Lie algebra has only trivial central extensions.
Proof
Since every central extension comes from a 2-cocycle , it suffices to show that every 2-cocycle is a coboundary. The task is to use this 2-cocycle to manufacture a 1-cochain  such that .

The first step is to, for each , use  to define a linear map . Next, a linear map  is defined that turns out to be a derivation. Thus set, trusting that  is a derivation,

Let  be the 1-cochain defined by

Then

showing that  is a coboundary. By the previous results, any central extension is trivial.

To verify that  actually is a derivation, first note that it is linear since  is, then compute

The observation that one can define a derivation , given a symmetric non-degenerate associative form  and a 2-cocycle , by

leads to a corollary.

Corollary
Let {{mvar|L:g × g: → F}} be a non-degenerate symmetric associative bilinear form and let  be a derivation satisfying

then  defined by

is a 2-cocycle.

Proof
The Jacobi identity for 2-cocycles follows starting with

The answer is, by Lie's third theorem affirmative.

Applications
The "negative" result of the preceding theorem indicates that one must, at least for semisimple Lie algebras, go to infinite-dimensional Lie algebras to find useful applications of central extensions. There are indeed such. Here will be presented affine Kac–Moody algebras and Virasoro algebras. These are extensions of polynomial loop-algebras and the Witt algebra respectively.

Polynomial loop-algebra
Let  be a polynomial loop algebra (background),

where  is a complex finite-dimensional simple Lie algebra. The goal is to find a central extension of this algebra. Two of the theorems apply. On the other hand, if this 2-cocycle is acting on the  part (only), then the resulting extension is trivial. One such set of derivations is 

This requires

Symmetry of  implies

and associativity yields

With  one sees that . This last condition implies the former. Using this fact, define . The defining equation then becomes

For every  the definition

does define a symmetric associative bilinear form

These span a vector space of forms which have the right properties.

Returning to the derivations at hand and the condition

one sees, using the definitions, that

This (and the antisymmetry condition) holds if , in particular it holds when .

With these choices, the premises in the corollary are satisfied. The 2-cocycle  defined by

with Lie bracket

For basis elements, suitably normalized and with antisymmetric structure constants, one has

This is a universal central extension of the polynomial loop algebra.

A note on terminology
In physics terminology, the algebra of above might pass for a Kac–Moody algebra, whilst it will probably not in mathematics terminology. An additional dimension, an extension by a derivation is required for this. It is an additional quantum number. An additional operator whose eigenvalues are precisely the levels is introduced further below.

Current algebra

As an application of a central extension of polynomial loop algebra, a current algebra of a quantum field theory is considered (background). Suppose one has a current algebra, with the interesting commutator being

with a Schwinger term. To construct this algebra mathematically, let  be the centrally extended polynomial loop algebra of the previous section with

as one of the commutation relations, or, with a switch of notation with a factor of  under the physics convention,

One notes that

so that it is defined on a circle. Now compute the commutator,

For simplicity, switch coordinates so that  and use the commutation relations,

Now employ the Poisson summation formula,

and finally

or

since the delta functions arguments only ensure that the arguments of the left and right arguments of the commutator are equal (formally ).

In the classical setting of quantum field theory, this is perhaps of little use, but with the advent of string theory where fields live on world sheets of strings, and spatial dimensions are curled up, there may be relevant applications.

Kac–Moody algebra

Simply set

Next, define as a vector space

For convenience, define

In addition, assume the basis on the underlying finite-dimensional simple Lie algebra has been chosen so that the structure coefficients are antisymmetric in all indices and that the basis is appropriately normalized. Then one immediately through the definitions verifies the following commutation relations.

These are precisely the short-hand description of an untwisted affine Kac–Moody algebra. To recapitulate, begin with a finite-dimensional simple Lie algebra. Define a space of formal Laurent polynomials with coefficients in the finite-dimensional simple Lie algebra. With the support of a symmetric non-degenerate alternating bilinear form and a derivation, a 2-cocycle is defined, subsequently used in the standard prescription for a central extension by a 2-cocycle. Extend the derivation to this new space, use the standard prescription for a split extension by a derivation and an untwisted affine Kac–Moody algebra obtains.

Virasoro algebra

The purpose is to construct the Virasoro algebra (named after Miguel Angel Virasoro) as a central extension by a 2-cocycle  of the Witt algebra  (background). The Jacobi identity for 2-cocycles yields

Letting  and using antisymmetry of  one obtains

In the extension, the commutation relations for the element  are

It is desirable to get rid of the central charge on the right hand side. To do this define

Then, using  as a 1-cochain, 

so with this 2-cocycle, equivalent to the previous one, one has

With this new 2-cocycle (skip the prime) the condition becomes

and thus

where the last condition is due to the antisymmetry of the Lie bracket.

This is a difference equation generally solved by

With  it is possible to change basis (or modify the 2-cocycle by a 2-coboundary) so that

with the central charge absent altogether, and the extension is hence trivial. (This was not (generally) the case with the previous modification, where only  obtained the original relations.) With  the following change of basis,

the commutation relations take the form

It also shows that  is one-dimensional (corresponding to the choice of ). The conventional choice is to take  and still retaining freedom by absorbing an arbitrary factor in the arbitrary object . The Virasoro algebra  is then

with commutation relations

Bosonic open strings

The relativistic classical open string (background) is subject to quantization. This roughly amounts to taking the position and the momentum of the string and promoting them to operators on the space of states of open strings. Since strings are extended objects, this results in a continuum of operators depending on the parameter . The following commutation relations are postulated in the Heisenberg picture.

All other commutators vanish.

Because of the continuum of operators, and because of the delta functions, it is desirable to express these relations instead in terms of the quantized versions of the Virasoro modes, the Virasoro operators. These are calculated to satisfy

They are interpreted as creation and annihilation operators acting on Hilbert space, increasing or decreasing the quantum of their respective modes. If the index is negative, the operator is a creation operator, otherwise it is an annihilation operator. (If it is zero, it is proportional to the total momentum operator.) In view of the fact that the light cone plus and minus modes were expressed in terms of the transverse Virasoro modes, one must consider the commutation relations between the Virasoro operators. These were classically defined (then modes) as

Since, in the quantized theory, the alphas are operators, the ordering of the factors matter. In view of the commutation relation between the mode operators, it will only matter for the operator  (for which ).  is chosen normal ordered,

where  is a possible ordering constant. One obtains after a somewhat lengthy calculation the relations

Instead one has

upon identification of the generic central term as  times the identity operator, this is the Virasoro algebra, the universal central extension of the Witt algebra.

The operator  enters the theory as the Hamiltonian, modulo an additive constant. Moreover, the Virasoro operators enter into the definition of the Lorentz generators of the theory. It is perhaps the most important algebra in string theory. The consistency of the Lorentz generators, by the way, fixes the spacetime dimensionality to 26. While this theory presented here (for relative simplicity of exposition) is unphysical, or at the very least incomplete (it has, for instance, no fermions) the Virasoro algebra arises in the same way in the more viable superstring theory and M-theory.

Group extension

A projective representation  of a Lie group  (background) can be used to define a so-called group extension .

In quantum mechanics, Wigner's theorem asserts that if  is a symmetry group, then it will be represented projectively on Hilbert space by unitary or antiunitary operators. This works nicely for the rotation group  and the Lorentz group , but it does not work when the symmetry group is the Galilean group. In this case one has to pass to its central extension, the Bargmann group, which is the symmetry group of the Schrödinger equation. Likewise, if , the group of translations in position and momentum space, one has to pass to its central extension, the Heisenberg group.

Define

as a set and let the multiplication be defined by

One has for the unit element

and for the inverse

This means that  is not semisimple. The center may be larger.

as a vector space and endowed with the Lie bracket

This 2-cocycle can be obtained from  albeit in a highly nontrivial way.

Now by using the projective representation  one may define a map  by

It has the properties

In the context of Wigner's theorem, the situation may be depicted as such (replace  by ); let  denote the unit sphere in Hilbert space , and let  be its inner product. Let  denote ray space and  the ray product. Let moreover a wiggly arrow denote a group action. Then the diagram

commutes, i.e.

Moreover, in the same way that  is a symmetry of  preserving ,  is a symmetry of  preserving .

Background material
In order to adequately discuss extensions, structure that goes beyond the defining properties of a Lie algebra is needed. Rudimentary facts about these are collected here for quick reference.

Derivations
A derivation  on a Lie algebra  is a map

such that the Leibniz rule

holds. The set of derivations on a Lie algebra  is denoted . It is itself a Lie algebra under the Lie bracket

One has to show

If the rhs holds, differentiate and set  implying that the lhs holds. If the lhs holds , write the rhs as

and differentiate the rhs of this expression. It is, using , identically zero.

For finite-dimensional simple Lie algebras all derivations are inner derivations.

Semidirect product (groups)

Denote with  the set  and define multiplication by 

Now make use of the Lie correspondence. The maps  each induce, at the level of Lie algebras, a map . This map is computed by

Now  [  if  is finite-dimensional] is a homomorphism, and appealing once more to the Lie correspondence, there is a unique Lie algebra homomorphism . This map is (formally) given by

for example, if , then (formally)

Lie algebra
The Lie algebra is, as a vector space, . The Lie bracket is given by

One has 

and

and

Cohomology

For the present purposes, consideration of a limited portion of the theory Lie algebra cohomology suffices. The definitions are not the most general possible, or even the most common ones, but the objects they refer to are authentic instances of more the general definitions.

2-cocycles

that are alternating,

and having a property resembling the Jacobi identity called the Jacobi identity for 2-cycles,

2-cocycles from 1-cochains
Some 2-cocycles can be obtained from 1-cochains.

The set of all such maps is denoted  and, of course (in at least the finite-dimensional case) . Using a 1-cochain , a 2-cocycle  may be defined by

The linear map  is called the coboundary operator (here restricted to ).

The second cohomology group
The quotient

Equivalent
2-cocycles are called cohomologous.

These notions generalize in several directions. For this, see the main articles.

Structure constants

Then each  has a unique expression as

for some indexing set  of suitable size. In this expansion, only finitely many  are nonzero. In the sequel it is (for simplicity) assumed that the basis is countable, and Latin letters are used for the indices and the indexing set can be taken to be . One immediately has

for the basis elements, where the summation symbol has been rationalized away, the summation convention applies. The placement of the indices in the structure constants (up or down) is immaterial. The following theorem is useful:

Theorem:There is a basis such that the structure constants are antisymmetric in all indices if and only if the Lie algebra is a direct sum of simple compact Lie algebras and  Lie algebras. This is the case if and only if there is a real positive definite metric  on  satisfying the invariance condition

in any basis. This last condition is necessary on physical grounds for non-Abelian gauge theories in quantum field theory. Thus one can produce an infinite list of possible gauge theories using the Cartan catalog of simple Lie algebras on their compact form (i.e., etc. One such gauge theory is the  gauge theory of the standard model with Lie algebra .

Killing form

The Killing form is a symmetric bilinear form on  defined by

Here  is viewed as a matrix operating on the vector space . The key fact needed is that if  is semisimple, then, by Cartan's criterion,  is non-degenerate. If , then there is a  such that

This resembles the Riesz representation theorem and the proof is virtually the same. The Killing form has the property

which is referred to as associativity. By defining  and expanding the inner brackets in terms of structure constants, one finds that the Killing form satisfies the invariance condition of above.

Loop algebra

Any subalgebra of such a Lie algebra is referred to as a loop algebra. Attention here is focused on polynomial loop algebras of the form

Now write

to obtain

Thus the functions

constitute the Lie algebra.

This algebra is isomorphic with the algebra

where  is the algebra of Laurent polynomials,

The Lie bracket is

In terms of a basis and structure constants,

It is also common to have a different notation,

where the omission of  should be kept in mind to avoid confusion; the elements really are functions . The Lie bracket is then

which is recognizable as one of the commutation relations in an untwisted affine Kac–Moody algebra, to be introduced later, without the central term. It generates (as seen by tracing backwards in the definitions) the set of constant maps from  into , which is obviously isomorphic with  when  is onto (which is the case when  is compact. As a consequence, 

Such a representation is called unitary because the representatives

are unitary.

Current algebra (physics)
Current algebras arise in quantum field theories as a consequence of global gauge symmetry. Conserved currents occur in classical field theories whenever the Lagrangian respects a continuous symmetry. This is the content of Noether's theorem. Most (perhaps all) modern quantum field theories can be formulated in terms of classical Lagrangians (prior to quantization), so Noether's theorem applies in the quantum case as well. Upon quantization, the conserved currents are promoted to position dependent operators on Hilbert space. These operators are subject to commutation relations, generally forming an infinite-dimensional Lie algebra. A model illustrating this is presented below.

To enhance the flavor of physics, factors of  will appear here and there as opposed to in the mathematical conventions.

Consider a column vector  of scalar fields . Let the Lagrangian density be

This Lagrangian is invariant under the transformation

where  are generators of either  or a closed subgroup thereof, satisfying

Noether's theorem asserts the existence of  conserved currents,

The reason these currents are said to be conserved is because

and consequently

the charge associated to the charge density  is constant in time. This (so far classical) theory is quantized promoting the fields and their conjugates to operators on Hilbert space and by postulating (bosonic quantization) the commutation relationsThere are alternative routes to quantization, e.g. one postulates the existence of creation and annihilation operators for all particle types with certain exchange symmetries based on which statistics, Bose–Einstein or Fermi–Dirac, the particles obey, in which case the above are derived for scalar bosonic fields using mostly Lorentz invariance and the demand for the unitarity of the S-matrix. In fact, all operators on Hilbert space can be built out of creation and annihilation operators. See e.g. , chapters 2–5.

The currents accordingly become operators They satisfy, using the above postulated relations, the definitions and integration over space, the commutation relations

where the speed of light and the reduced Planck constant have been set to unity. The next commutator to consider is

The presence of the delta functions and their derivatives is explained by the requirement of microcausality that implies that the commutator vanishes when . The following terms are the Schwinger terms. They integrate to zero, but it can be shown quite generally that they must be nonzero.

Consider a conserved current

with a generic Schwinger term

By taking the vacuum expectation value (VEV),

one finds

Now insert a complete set of states, 

Affine Kac–Moody algebra

Let  be an -dimensional complex simple Lie algebra with a dedicated suitable normalized basis such that the structure constants are antisymmetric in all indices with commutation relations

An untwisted affine Kac–Moody algebra  is obtained by copying the basis for each  (regarding the copies as distinct), setting

as a vector space and assigning the commutation relations

Witt algebra

The Witt algebra, named after Ernst Witt, is the complexification of the Lie algebra  of smooth vector fields on the circle . In coordinates, such vector fields may be written

and the Lie bracket is the Lie bracket of vector fields, on  simply given by

The algebra is denoted .

This basis satisfies

This Lie algebra has a useful central extension, the Virasoro algebra.

For  one has

 
and the same map holds at the level of Lie algebras due to the properties of the exponential map.

Now compute

Projective representation

If  is a matrix Lie group, then elements  of its Lie algebra m can be given by

Commutators of elements of the Lie algebra can be computed using two paths,  and the group commutator,

Likewise, given a group representation , its Lie algebra  is computed by

In a projective representation the multiplication rule reads

The function ,often required to be smooth, satisfies

One has

For an explanation of the phase factors , see Wigner's theorem.

become in 

Relativistic classical string theory

A classical relativistic string traces out a world sheet in spacetime, just like a point particle traces out a world line. Points  in spacetime can, in the range of the parametrization, be written . One uses a capital  to denote points in spacetime actually being on the world sheet of the string. The inverse of the parametrization provides a local coordinate system on the world sheet in the sense of manifolds.

The equations of motion of a classical relativistic string derived in the Lagrangian formalism from the Nambu–Goto action are

A dot between quantities denotes the relativistic inner product.

These rather formidable equations simplify considerably with a clever choice of parametrization called the light cone gauge. In this gauge, the equations of motion become

the ordinary wave equation. The price to be paid is that the light cone gauge imposes constraints,

so that one cannot simply take arbitrary solutions of the wave equation to represent the strings. The strings considered here are open strings, i.e. they don't close up on themselves. This means that the Neumann boundary conditions have to be imposed on the endpoints. With this, the general solution of the wave equation (excluding constraints) is given by 

where  is the slope parameter of the string (related to the string tension).

This is rewritten, first defining

and then writing

In order to satisfy the constraints, one passes to light cone coordinates. For , where  is the number of space'' dimensions, set 

Not all  are independent. Some are zero (hence missing in the equations above), and the "minus coefficients" satisfy

The quantity on the left is given a name, 

the transverse Virasoro mode'''.

When the theory is quantized, the alphas, and hence the  become operators.

See also
Group cohomology
Group contraction (Inönu–Wigner contraction)
Group extension
Lie algebra cohomology

Remarks

Notes

References

Books

Journals

 (English translation)

 This can be found in Kac–Moody and Virasoro algebras, A reprint Volume for Physicists
 (open access)

Web

Lie groups
Quantum field theory
Lie algebras
Mathematical physics
Conformal field theory
String theory